Nudosia is a monotypic moth genus in the subfamily Arctiinae. Its single species, Nudosia fuscifusca, is found in Peru. Both the genus and species were first described by George Hampson in 1900.

References

Lithosiini
Monotypic moth genera
Moths of South America